James Akenhead (born 6 June 1983 in London, England) is a professional English poker player, sponsored by Genting Poker. and part of the London-based poker group The Hitsquad. He is best known for being a member of the November Nine in 2009.

World Series of Poker
At the 2008 World Series of Poker, he finished runner-up to Grant Hinkle in Event #2, a $1,500 No Limit Texas hold 'em tournament. He lost the heads-up battle when he managed to provoke Hinkle to put all his chips in with 10 4, an underdog to his AK, only to see the flop come 10 10 4. The fourth 10 on the turn sealed the victory for Hinkle and Akenhead settled for second place and a $520,000 payday.

Akenhead was the only British player to reach the November Nine final table at the 2009 World Series of Poker. He started the final table with the least amount of chips and was knocked out in ninth place by Kevin Schaffel. Akenhead won $1,263,602 for his performance.

In the same year, Akenhead was one of two November Nine members to reach the final table of the World Series of Poker Europe main event, the £10,000 No-Limit Hold 'Em championship, the other member being Antoine Saout. Akenhead was eliminated in ninth place, earning him £66,533 ($109,687).

Other Poker Accomplishments
Akenhead is a regular on the Grosvenor U.K. Poker Tour and finished fourth in the 888.com U.K. Open in 2008 after winning two preliminary heats.

In December 2009, Akenhead won the Poker Million 8 tournament, winning $500,000 in the process.

On 22 January 2012, Akenhead playing under the screen-name Asprin1 won the Pokerstars Sunday Million for $213,750.00. The tournament began with a field of 7,125 entries.

References

1983 births
Poker players from London
Poker After Dark tournament winners
Living people